Rajesh Kachhap is an Indian politician who is serving as a Member of the Jharkhand Legislative Assembly from the Khijri representing the Indian National Congress in 2019 Jharkhand Legislative Assembly election.

References

Living people
21st-century Indian politicians
People from Jharkhand
Date of birth missing (living people)
Place of birth missing (living people)
Year of birth missing (living people)